The A. J. Borden Building is a historic commercial building located at 91–111 South Main Street in Fall River, Massachusetts.

Description and history 
It was built in 1889 by Andrew Jackson Borden and designed by Fall River architect Joseph M. Darling, who also notably designed several schools in the city.

After Borden's murder in 1892, the building was occupied by various businesses and owned by his daughter, Lizzie Borden until her death in 1927. The JJ Newbury dime store later occupied the building from 1931 into the early 1980s when it was acquired by Aetna Insurance Company. Today, it is occupied by the Travelers of Massachusetts insurance company.

It was added to the National Register of Historic Places on February 16, 1983.

See also
National Register of Historic Places listings in Fall River, Massachusetts
Corky Row Historic District

References

Buildings and structures in Fall River, Massachusetts
Office buildings on the National Register of Historic Places in Massachusetts
Office buildings completed in 1889
National Register of Historic Places in Fall River, Massachusetts
1889 establishments in Massachusetts